Kolomenskoye is a rural locality (a selo) in Kondrashkinskoye Rural Settlement, Kashirsky District, Voronezh Oblast, Russia. The population was 229 as of 2010. There are 3 streets.

Geography 
Kolomenskoye is located 13 km northeast of Kashirskoye (the district's administrative centre) by road. Kondrashkino is the nearest rural locality.

References 

Rural localities in Kashirsky District, Voronezh Oblast